The United Party was a political party in South Africa. It was the country's ruling political party between 1934 and 1948.

Formation
The United Party was formed by a merger of most of Prime Minister Barry Hertzog's National Party with the rival South African Party of Jan Smuts, plus the remnants of the Unionist Party. Its full name was the United National South African Party, but it was generally called the "United Party". The party drew support from several different parts of South African society, including English-speakers, Afrikaners and Coloureds.

Hertzog led the party until 1939.  In that year, Hertzog refused to commit South Africa to Britain's war effort against Nazi Germany. Many Afrikaners who had fought in the Second Boer War were still alive, and British war crimes during that conflict were still fresh in their memory. Hertzog felt that siding with the former enemy would be unacceptable to Afrikaners. Furthermore, he could see little benefit for South Africa in taking part in a war that he saw as an essentially European affair.

The majority of the United Party caucus were of a different mind, however, and Hertzog resigned. Jan Smuts succeeded him and led the party and the country throughout World War II and the immediate post-war years.

Decline
Smuts and the United Party lost the 1948 election to the National Party. It never held power again. J. G. N. Strauss succeeded Smuts in 1950, and was in turn replaced by Sir de Villiers Graaff in 1956 until 1977. Attrition characterised his leadership years, as the party slowly declined because of electoral gerrymandering, changes to South Africa's voting laws, including the removal of the 'Coloureds' –  South Africans of mixed ancestry, who had been staunch United Party supporters – from the electoral rolls, and defections to other parties such as the Progressive Party, which was formed in 1959 by liberal former UP members that sought a stronger opposition to apartheid. Despite this, the party remained relatively stable until the 1970s.

Schwarz breakaway
There was much division in the party, between liberals and conservatives. Divisions came to a head in 1972 when Harry Schwarz, leader of the liberal "Young Turks" within the party, wrestled the leadership of the party in the Transvaal from Marais Steyn. His victory was a visible sign of strength from the liberals within the party. On 4 January 1974, he met with Mangosuthu Buthelezi and signed a five-point plan for racial peace in South Africa, which came to be known as the Mahlabatini Declaration of Faith. It was the first occasion in apartheid South Africa's history where the principles of peaceful transition and equality had been enshrined in a document which had been jointly signed by acknowledged black and white political leaders in South Africa. The declaration, however provoked an angry response from the conservative "Old Guard" in the party, including the party's leader.

In 1975 Harry Schwarz and three other Members of Parliament (MPs) were expelled from the United Party. Further resignations followed, which included two senators, ten members of the Transvaal Provincial Council, 14 out of the 36 Johannesburg City Councillors and four Randburg City Councillors. This made it the official opposition in the Transvaal Provincial Council. They formed the Reform Party which elected Schwarz as leader. Schwarz's breakaway led to the demise of the United Party and realigned opposition politics in South Africa. The Reform Party soon merged with the Progressive Party to form the Progressive Reform Party (PRP).

In 1977, after merging with the Democratic Party, which had been formed by moderate NP dissidents, the United Party was renamed the New Republic Party. A significant number of its parliamentarians refused to remain with the renamed party. Some joined the anti-apartheid PRP (now called the Progressive Federal Party).  Six MPs were expelled from the United Party for refusing to accept the plan to form the NRP and formed the South African Party which joined the ruling National Party three years later. Elections in late 1977 left the New Republic Party gutted, with only 10 parliamentary seats, down from the 41 held by the United Party.

Political position and legacy

The UP's position on race relations in South Africa was a complex one; while the UP was more liberal in character than the National Party, it never clearly articulated its views on the best approach to them. Smuts himself alluded to the fact that at some unspecified point in the future, black South Africans might be asked to share power with the white minority, provided black politicians demonstrated their commitment to 'civilised' norms of political and personal conduct. Generally, though, the UP seemed to have little difficulty in tacitly supporting apartheid. One of the reasons the UP fared so disastrously in the 1948 election was its lack of commitment to a clear policy on race relations. This stood in contrast to the National Party, which was firmly and unequivocally behind the notion of preserving white supremacy at all costs.

The UP was against apartheid as a system, but also favoured the continuation of white minority rule, akin to the political arrangements in Rhodesia at the time. During the late 1960s the party tried to gain support by its resistance to the National Party's politics on giving land to the bantustans, insisting on a single citizenship for all South Africans. By the 1970s, the UP advocated federalism and a gradual retreat from official segregation and discrimination.

The party supported links with the Commonwealth of Nations, and unsuccessfully campaigned against the establishment of a republic in the whites-only referendum held on 5 October 1960.

By the late 1970s, the breakaway and successor groups of the United Party – the Progressive Federal Party, New Republic Party and South African Party – were more or less committed to a multiracial federation as a solution to the racial question. The ruling National Party's reform program under PW Botha initially attracted some liberal support while provoking divisions within its ranks. By 1987, the NRP was in decline and its base absorbed by parties formed by NP dissidents; these merged with the PFP in 1989 to form the Democratic Party which is now the Democratic Alliance, thus reuniting the currents that originated in the United Party.

Electoral history

Presidential elections

House of Assembly elections

Senate elections

See also 
List of political parties in South Africa

References

External links

 "Revisiting Urban African Policy and the Reforms of the Smuts Government, 1939–48", by Gary Baines

Liberal parties in South Africa
Conservative parties in South Africa
Protestant political parties
Political parties established in 1934
Defunct political parties in South Africa
Organisations associated with apartheid
Monarchist parties
Political parties disestablished in 1977
1934 establishments in South Africa
1977 disestablishments in South Africa